Montgirod is a former commune in the Savoie department in the Auvergne-Rhône-Alpes region in south-eastern France. On 1 January 2016, it was merged into the new commune of Aime-la-Plagne.  In August 1994, its town hall square was renamed the "Place du Colonel Peter Ortiz", after U.S. Marine Corps officer Peter J. Ortiz.

Population

See also
Communes of the Savoie department

References

External links

Official site

Former communes of Savoie